Moala Delvalle Tautuaa Jr. (born April 30, 1989) is an American born Filipino-Tongan professional basketball player for the San Miguel Beermen of the Philippine Basketball Association (PBA). He was drafted first overall by the TNT Tropang Texters in the 2015 PBA draft.

High school and college career

Tautuaa attended high school at Claremont High School in Claremont, California. In his senior year at Claremont High, he averaged 21 points and seven rebounds per game.

He suited up for Chadron State College, an NCAA Division II school. He led the CSC Eagles in scoring with 12.9 points a game and rebounding with 5.6 per game in his senior year. His 63.5 percent field goal percentage led the team and ranked second in the Rocky Mountain Athletic Conference.  During his career at CSC, he shot 62.6 percent (426-681) from the field to break the old mark of 61.9 percent that Elijah Collins set during 2001-05. He finished with 1,160 points, tying him for 17th all-time at CSC.

Professional career

ABL / PBA D-League
He applied for the 2012 NBA draft but went undrafted. He then decided to resume his basketball career by playing as an import for the Westports Malaysia Dragons in the ASEAN Basketball League. Initially discovered by former PBA player Pongky Alolor, he was introduced to KL Dragons' head coach Ariel Vanguardia during the latter's visit to San Francisco and was recruited to join the team. He became teammates and friends with current PBA player Justin Melton. He averaged 15.6 points, 7.6 rebounds and 0.6 block for the Dragons, who started off the 2014 season with a 2-1 win–loss record.

After his stint in the ABL, he processed his citizenship papers at the Bureau of Immigration of the Philippines to prove his Filipino lineage and applied for the 2014 PBA D-League Draft, where he was drafted first overall by Cagayan Rising Suns. He helped the Suns reach the Finals against the powerhouse Hapee Fresh Fighters. He was then signed by the Cebuana Lhuillier Gems into a one-conference contract, where he spent the remainder of the season. He was the 2015 PBA D-League Foundation Cup MVP while playing for Cebuana Lhuillier and took them to the semifinals.

PBA
After spending a season in the D-League, he applied, along with 16 other Fil-Foreigners, for the 2015 PBA draft, according to the list released by the PBA on August 10, 2015.  He, along with former NU Bulldog Troy Rosario, was the consensus top pick leading to the draft day.

On August 23, 2015, he was drafted 1st overall by the TNT Tropang Texters in the rookie draft. On August 27, 2015, both he and newly acquired #2 pick Troy Rosario signed maximum three-year rookie contracts with Talk 'N Text worth ₱ 8.5 million.

PBA career statistics

As of the end of 2021 season

Season-by-season averages

|-
| align=left | 
| align=left | TNT
| 41 || 17.6 || .541 || .289 || .600 || 4.1 || 1.2 || .4 || .2 || 8.9
|-
| align=left | 
| align=left | TNT
| 59 || 17.3 || .519 || .152 || .563 || 4.7 || .8 || .3 || .2 || 7.9
|-
| align=left rowspan=2| 
| align=left | TNT
| rowspan=2|34 || rowspan=2|25.5 || rowspan=2|.500 || rowspan=2|.290 || rowspan=2|.649 || rowspan=2|8.1 || rowspan=2|1.9 || rowspan=2|.5 || rowspan=2|.4 || rowspan=2|9.8
|-
| align=left | GlobalPort / NorthPort
|-
| align=left rowspan=2| 
| align=left | NorthPort
| rowspan=2|38 || rowspan=2|31.2 || rowspan=2|.499 || rowspan=2|.321 || rowspan=2|.670 || rowspan=2|7.5 || rowspan=2|2.9 || rowspan=2|.7 || rowspan=2|.2 || rowspan=2|14.0
|-
| align=left | San Miguel
|-
| align=left | 
| align=left | San Miguel
| 13 || 35.2 || .602 || .333 || .600 || 8.1 || 2.5 || .9 || .5 || 18.6
|-
| align=left | 
| align=left | San Miguel
| 32 || 19.1 || .507 || .293 || .686 || 4.6 || .8 || .3 || .4 || 9.0
|-class=sortbottom
| colspan="2" align="center" | Career
| 217 || 22.4 || .521 || .290 || .623 || 5.8 || 1.5 || .5 || .3 || 10.3
|}

International career

In 2015, Tautuaa joined the Gilas Pilipinas 3.0 training pool as a practice player and went with the entire team to Estonia to participate in a pocket tournament. He also saw action in the 2015 William Jones Cup where Gilas won the silver medal.

He would only be eligible to play for any FIBA sanctioned tournament as an alternate naturalized player since he was not able to secure his Philippine passport before he turned 16 years old.

Player profile

Tautuaa is a versatile big man.  He is considered a stretch "five" with ball-handling skills, range, passing abilities and someone who can rack up points, rebounds, assists, blocks, etc., not to mention his penchant for dunks, putbacks, chasing down loose balls and his uncanny basketball IQ.

Personal life
Tautuaa's father is Moala Sr. from the Pacific Island nation of Tonga, while his mother is Romanita (née Del Valle), a Filipina, who hails from Taguig. He earned a degree in Criminal Justice, and can also speak Tagalog. He is often teased with the nickname "Pebbles".

References

1989 births
Living people
American men's basketball players
American people of Tongan descent
American sportspeople of Filipino descent
Basketball players from California
Centers (basketball)
Chadron State Eagles men's basketball players
Competitors at the 2019 Southeast Asian Games
Competitors at the 2021 Southeast Asian Games
Filipino expatriate basketball people in Malaysia
Filipino expatriate sportspeople in Malaysia
Filipino men's 3x3 basketball players
Filipino men's basketball players
Citizens of the Philippines through descent
Kuala Lumpur Dragons players
NorthPort Batang Pier players
People from San Mateo, California
Philippine Basketball Association All-Stars
Philippines men's national basketball team players
Philippines national 3x3 basketball team players
Power forwards (basketball)
San Miguel Beermen players
Southeast Asian Games gold medalists for the Philippines
Southeast Asian Games medalists in 3x3 basketball
Southeast Asian Games medalists in basketball
Southeast Asian Games silver medalists for the Philippines
TNT Tropang Giga draft picks
TNT Tropang Giga players